Anni Podimata is a Greek politician who served as Vice-President of the European Parliament and Member of Sixth European Parliament and Seventh European Parliament.

References 

Greek politicians
MEPs for Greece 2004–2009
Politicians from Athens
1962 births
Living people
MEPs for Greece 2009–2014
21st-century women MEPs for Greece
PASOK MEPs